"Everything, Everyday, Everywhere" is the third official single from rapper Fabolous's album, Loso's Way. It features Keri Hilson and Ryan Leslie, the latter also providing the songs production.

Music video
The music video for the song shows Fabolous and Keri Hilson performing at a party. In the video, people are getting their picture taken.
DJ Khaled, Trey Songz, Rick Ross, DJ Clue, Rocko, Red Cafe, Gorilla Zoe, Shawty Lo, Lil Scrappy, Yung Joc, Fat Joe, Adrienne Bailon, Amerie, and Ace Hood make cameo appearances. The video was listed at  #98 on BET's Notarized: Top 100 Videos of 2009 countdown.

Trivia
The song was used in Gossip Girl, Season 3 Episode 17 "Inglorious Basstards."

Charts

References

2009 singles
Fabolous songs
Keri Hilson songs
Song recordings produced by Ryan Leslie
Music videos directed by Erik White
Songs written by Fabolous
2009 songs
Def Jam Recordings singles
Songs written by Ryan Leslie
Songs written by Keri Hilson